Didone may refer to:

Dido, also known as Didone, character in multiple operas and artworks
Didone (opera), of 1640 by Francesco Cavalli
Didone (typography), a genre of serif typeface

See also 
 Dido (disambiguation)
 Didone abbandonata (disambiguation)